Lampozhnya is a rural locality (a village) in Mezenskoye Rural Settlement of Mezensky District, Arkhangelsk Oblast, Russia. The population was 97 as of 2010. There is 1 street.

Geography 
Lampozhnya is located on the Mezen River, 23 km south of Mezen (the district's administrative centre) by road. Zaton is the nearest rural locality.

References 

Rural localities in Mezensky District
Mezensky Uyezd